Kernow may refer to:

 Cornwall, a county of the UK
 Kernow (bus company), a bus company in Cornwall
 Mebyon Kernow, a political party in Cornwall

See also

 
 Cornouaille, a region of Brittany, France
 Kern (disambiguation)
 Cornwall (disambiguation)
 Cornwallis (disambiguation)
 Cornouaille (disambiguation)